The 2007 Cricket World Cup warm-up matches were held prior to the 2007 Cricket World Cup, between 5 March and 9 March 2007. All 16 nations that were qualified to take part in the World Cup participated in a series of matches to prepare, experiment with different tactics and to help them acclimatise to conditions in the West Indies. The warm-up matches were not classified as One Day Internationals by the International Cricket Council (ICC), despite sharing some of main features of this form of cricket, but some of the playing regulations were different from standard internationals in order to allow teams to experiment. For example, the main change allowed for thirteen different players to play in a match – nine players being allowed to both bat and bowl, with two only being able to bowl and two only being able to bat – instead of the eleven players normally allowed.

Several of the teams voiced concerns of various matters involving the stadia and practicing facilities: many of the stadiums were considered incomplete, whilst some teams claimed that the pitches were uneven, resulting in an unsafe experience to be batting in. Ultimately none of the stadia used in the warm-up games were used in any other part of the tournament except for the Greenfield Stadium in Trelawny, Jamaica, which hosted the opening ceremony but no matches.

Australia, Bangladesh, India and Pakistan were the only teams to win both of their warm-up games, whilst Bermuda, Canada, the Netherlands and Scotland did not win either of their fixtures.

Match status
None of the warm-up games were officially recognised as ODIs or List A matches by the International Cricket Council due to various changes in the rules of the game. Whilst normally only 11 players are allowed to bat and field (excluding situations involving a substitute fielder), 13 players were used in each team's squad for the matches – 11 of which were allowed to field at one time and 11 of which were allowed to bat (meaning players could be swapped in and out when fielding or bowling, but two players did not bat in a match). In official ICC matches match referees are required to help officiate a game, but due to the changes in the rules none were appointed for any of the warm-up games. Additionally, Man of the Match awards were not given out and no reserve days were set for these matches.

Preparation problems

A number of preparation problems surfaced before the start of the World Cup. Some of the venues were not complete by the opening ceremony on 11 March 2007. At Sabina Park, seats had to be removed at the newly constructed north-stand due to safety concerns. At Trelawny Stadium in Jamaica, ground staff were unable to gain admission to the ground during the warm-up matches due to accreditation problems.

During the Pakistan and Canada warm-up match at Sir Frank Worrell Memorial Ground, the sight screen was knocked down and the game was delayed by over 70 minutes and reduced to 48 overs. Additionally, a tear gas canister exploded at the Trinidad hotel where the Pakistan, South Africa, Canada and Ireland teams were staying. The hotel had to be evacuated but no injuries were reported.

A number of concerns were expressed regarding the conditions of the pitches for the warm-up matches. During the Pakistan and South Africa warm-up game, the teams were unhappy with the condition of the pitch, claiming irregular bounce off the wicket was "treacherous". In addition, a number of teams expressed concern over the slow wickets used during the warm-up matches, although Cricinfo writer Sambit Bal welcomed the pitches slowing down as a method of making the battle between the batsmen and the bowlers more equal.

Schedule and results

Monday 5 March 2007

Tuesday 6 March 2007

Thursday 8 March 2007

Friday 9 March 2007

Aggregate results

Note: Due to the change in the rules for these matches, the results did not have any effect on the ICC ODI Championship table or the ICC Associate ODI rankings.

See also
2007 Cricket World Cup Group A
2007 Cricket World Cup Group B
2007 Cricket World Cup Super Eight stage
2007 Cricket World Cup Final

References

External links
Cricinfo - World Cup Warm-Up Matches
CricketArchive - 2007 Cricket World Cup

warm-up
Cricket World Cup matches